Gabriola Island is one of the Gulf Islands in the Strait of Georgia in British Columbia (BC), Canada.

Gabriola has public beaches and forests, shopping centres, restaurants, a library, an elementary school and a museum. It is known as the Isle of the Arts due to its high percentage of working artists, and its many cultural events include annual festivals related to art, poetry, gardens, music, boating and fishing. The Gabriola Arts Council produces three large annual events: the Isle of the Arts Festival (April), Gabriola Theatre Festival (now defunct) and Thanksgiving Studio Tour (October).

History

Pre-contact
Gabriola is part of the traditional territory of the Snunéymux (of whose name the nearby city of Nanaimo was given an anglicized form). The earliest archeological record on Gabriola is a cave burial dated to about 1500 BC.

The pre-contact population of Gabriola is difficult to estimate, but in mid-Marpole times—between about AD 1 and 1000—several thousand people lived in the village at Senewélets or more commonly known as, False Narrows, the site of today's El Verano Drive. Archaeologists have found that infant mortality at that time was surprisingly low and that the population was well adapted to its environment. Other smaller villages on Gabriola were scattered around the coast. After contact, and perhaps as early as AD 1500, the population of the Snunéymux declined drastically from smallpox and other diseases brought to North America by Europeans. Overall, there are over 200 archaeological sites on Gabriola and the isles near it.

The island is famous for its petroglyphs, which, while commonly believed to be thousands of years old, are almost impossible to date. Because they are carved in relatively soft sandstone, they are eroding rapidly.

Post-contact
The first European visit to Gabriola was by the Spanish schooner Santa Saturnina under José María Narváez in 1791. Narváez is said to have given the name Punta de Gaviola to the southeastern end of the island. It may also have been Juan Francisco de la Bodega y Quadra, rather than Narváez, who bestowed the name. Over time, "Gaviola" may have been corrupted into "Gabriola" and applied to the whole island. Gaviola is sometimes said to be a misspelling of gaviota ("seagull"), but it may refer to the Spanish surname Gaviola.

In 1792, the island was again visited by a Spanish expedition, under Galiano and Valdés. Galiano and Valdés stayed at Pilot Bay for several days, to repair their vessels and explore the vicinity of what is now Nanaimo. They called the anchorage Cala del Descanso ("Cove of Rest"). Galiano stayed at the island for four days and while there, encountered several Indians and engaged in limited trading. Galiano also found an abandoned Indian village. This site was later wrongly identified as the present Descanso Bay by British cartographers.  The British expedition of George Vancouver may also have visited the island very briefly in 1792. While the Spanish explored and charted the Strait of Georgia, they left no permanent settlements. In 1827, fur traders of the Hudson's Bay Company established a post at Fort Langley on the Fraser River, but no Europeans settled in the Nanaimo area until the discovery of coal there in 1852. From the mid-1850s on, coal miners and ex-gold miners began to move to Gabriola, where they started farms to supply the growing population of Nanaimo.

By 1874, 17 settlers were working the land on Gabriola, and two-thirds of those had First Nations wives and young families. Portuguese settler John Silva, for whom Silva Bay was named, married "Louise," the daughter of a Cowichan chief, in 1873. Three of their sons volunteered to fight in the First World War; one was killed, another wounded. The name of Frank Silva, missing in action on Vimy Ridge in 1917, is inscribed on the Vimy Memorial in France.

In the early 20th century, the population of Gabriola grew slowly. By the 1950s, fewer than 400 people lived full-time on the island. Electricity came to Gabriola in 1955, but even then the population grew only about one percent a year until the 1970s. In roughly the next 10 years, the population tripled, in part due to hippie immigration from the United States. By the mid-1980s, the population was 2,000, half the current figure.

In summer, the island's population greatly increases. Even in the first half of the 20th century, families came from Nanaimo or Vancouver to estivate, spending weeks or months living a simpler, rural life on the island. In the 21st century, about  come to Gabriola each year for the sun, music, art, and relaxed pace, and they raise the population temporarily to about 6,000.

Apart from farming, Gabriola experienced industrial development in the 20th century. A brickyard produced  a day in the early part of the century, and they were sent principally to Victoria and Vancouver. The brickyard ceased functioning in the 1950s. In the 1890s and early twentieth century, sandstone blocks were cut from a quarry near Descanso Bay and shipped for architectural use in public buildings in Vancouver and Victoria. In the early- to mid-1930s, millstones were cut from the sandstone and sent to towns along the west coast and as far away as Finland for use in the pulp and paper industry.  A small diatomaceous earth industry also flourished in the 1930s. After World War II, the shipyard at Silva Bay became the major employer on the island until the 1970s.

Geography
Gabriola, part of the Regional District of Nanaimo, is the most northerly of the Southern Gulf Islands in the Strait of Georgia between mainland BC to the east and Vancouver Island to the west. The Gulf Islands are an archipelago consisting of hundreds of islands of various sizes stretching from the San Juan Islands in the United States to the Northern Gulf Islands, north of Gabriola. The biggest of the Southern Gulf Islands are Gabriola Island, Galiano Island, Kuper Island, North and South Pender Island, Saltspring Island, Saturna Island, Thetis Island, and Valdes Island.

The Southern Gulf Islands consist mainly of former seabed sediments crumpled and gradually thrust upward by tectonic plate movement between  ago. Subsequent periods of glaciation scraped away topsoil and some of the bedrock. Though melting glaciers left deposits of sand, gravel, and boulders, the main rocks exposed on Gabriola's surface are sandstone and shale. Differential erosion of relatively soft shales and relatively hard sandstones helped create  cliffs, points, and bays along Gabriola's shoreline.

The ferry, which takes 20 minutes for the crossing, runs almost hourly from 6:15 a.m, starting at the Gabriola side, to about 11:00 p.m. ,from Nanaimo, daily. Residents of Gabriola who work or attend high school in Nanaimo use the ferry to commute. Gabriola may also be reached by float plane or small boat.

 Islands and islets near Gabriola include Snake Island and Entrance Island to the north, the Flat Top Islands, Breakwater Island, and Valdes Island to the east, and Mudge Island, Link Island, and DeCourcy Island to the south. It passes near most parts of the island, including the ferry terminal at Descanso Bay.

The island has three provincial parks—Gabriola Sands Provincial Park on the northwest shore, Sandwell Provincial Park on the northeast shore, and Drumbeg Provincial Park on the east shore—as well as Descanso Bay Regional Park and an adjacent community park near the ferry terminal. Large coastal sandstone formations known as the Malaspina Galleries are preserved in this community park. The formations were named after the 18th-century Spanish explorer Alejandro Malaspina.

Demographics

The population of Gabriola rose by 15 percent, from 3,522 to 4,050, between 2001 and 2006. This growth rate was higher than that for BC as a whole, which grew at a rate of 5.3 percent. The population density  was 70.3/km2 (182.1 mi2) in 2006 compared to 4.4/km2 (11.4 mi2) for all of BC.

The total number of private dwellings on Gabriola was 2,744 in 2006, of which 1,998 were occupied by the usual residents. The median age of the population was 52.9 years compared to the BC median of 40.8. Of the total population, 1,960 were male and 2,090 were female.

Climate

Under the Köppen climate classification, the island has a cool summer Mediterranean climate due to its dry summers. Other climate classification systems, such as Trewartha, place it firmly in the Oceanic zone (Do). Days with temperatures below  occur about 25 times per year. Due to its mild winters, the average annual snowfall is low at  during the season.

Community
Island festivals include the annual Isle of the Arts Festival in April, Gabriola Theatre Festival (now defunct) in August, and the Thanksgiving Weekend Studio and Gallery Tour, all three events produced by the Gabriola Arts Council. The Shipyard School "Launch Festival" is held mid April in Silva Bay to celebrate the graduation of the students - this is a well-attended, two-day event high on the list for anyone interested in traditional wooden boats and their construction. The Concert on the Green and the Annual Salmon Barbecue occur in August. From May to October, the great Saturday Market at the Agricultural Hall features local produce and baked goods from the island, as well as crafts and high-quality artwork. Habonim Dror Camp Miriam, a Jewish summer camp, operates on the island from the end of June through the end of August.

 Folklife Village, on North Road a few minutes beyond the ferry terminal, is the island's main shopping centre. It was bought and transferred to Gabriola after its role as the Folklife Pavilion, a tribute to Canada's native and settler cultures, in Expo 86 in Vancouver. Other shopping areas can be found at Twin Beaches Mall on the north end of the island and Silva Bay on the south end. The island has a strong connection to the city of Nanaimo. Gabriola residents often refer to Gabriola as Gabe", Vancouver Island as The Big Island'' and Vancouver as "The Mainland".

Gabriola and surrounding islands have more than 70 known petroglyphs - sandstone carvings, some of which may be as old as 2,000 years or more. A small park at the Gabriola Museum contains reproductions of some of these petroglyphs.

Flora and fauna
A few of the plants common to the island include the trees Flowering dogwood, Douglas-fir, grand fir, Rocky Mountain juniper, Western hemlock, Western red cedar, arbutus, Garry oak, big leaf maple, and red alder; the shrubs Oregon-grape, and red-flowering currant; the perennial bulb small camas (common camas); the semi-aquatic or terrestrial herb Western skunk cabbage (swamp lantern), and the evergreen perennial Western sword fern.

Sea creatures near Gabriola include orcas (killer whales), sea lions, seals, otters, oysters, mussels, clams, basket cockles, moon snails, whelks, wolf eels, Pacific herring, octopuses, and salmon. Deer and raccoons are among the island's more common land animals.

In the winter months, the coast of Gabriola is visited by many species of waterfowl such as the scoter, bufflehead, Barrow's goldeneye, and harlequin duck. Shorebirds such as the black turnstone and ruddy turnstone frequent the island as do garden birds such as the ruby-crowned kinglet, golden-crowned kinglet, thrushes, warblers, pileated woodpeckers, and flickers. The bald eagle, common raven, European starling, peafowl and feral turkey are common year round. More than 250 bird species live in or migrate through the Nanaimo–Gabriola area.

References

External links
Tourism Gabriola
The Gabriola Arts Council
The Flying Shingle, Gabriola weekly newspaper
Gabriola Island Chamber of Commerce
Gabriola Museum
Gabriola Museum SHALE journal
Gabriola Recreation Society
Silva Bay Shipyard School
The Gabriola Sounder, weekly community newspaper
The Gabriola Auxiliary for Island Health Care Society

Islands of the Gulf Islands
Regional District of Nanaimo